Sri City or Satyavedu Reserve Infracity Pvt. Ltd. is an integrated business city (township) and special economic zone located in Tirupati district in the state of Andhra Pradesh, India. It was founded in 2008 and has now become one of the coveted business destinations in the country with total investments close to 4 billion USD and total exports exceeding 500 million USD till date. Sri City forms part of Satyavedu and Varadaiahpalem mandals of Tirupati district. It is located along the NH16 of Andhra Pradesh, India. Sri City boasts of seamless connectivity by road, air and sea ports. It is spread over 7500 acres, and includes a multiproduct Special Economic Zone (SEZ), a Domestic Tariff Zone (DTZ), a Free Trade & Warehousing Zone (FTWZ) and an Electronics Manufacturing Cluster. Inaugurated on August 8, 2008 by then Chief Minister of Andhra Pradesh, late Dr YS Rajasekhara Reddy, Sri City soon emerged as the preferred investment destination for several national and international brands. Sri City is home to over 200 companies from 28 countries including multinationals like Kellogg’s, Isuzu, Mondelez, Pepsi, Panasonic,Blue Star, Daikin, Kimberly Clark, Alstom, Kobelco, Foxconn, Danieli etc.

Geography 
It is situated between north latitudes of 13°29’50" & 13°34’40" and east longitudes of 79°57’30" & 80°02’50", at an average elevation of about 20 meters above MSL (66 ft) in Tirupati district of Andhra Pradesh. It is alongside NH 5 which forms part of the Golden Quadrilateral. A creek (Karipeti Kalava) flows through Sri City passing through a number of lakes on the way to joining Pulicat Lake north of Tada. There is a state forest on the western boundary. The Telugu Ganga project carrying Krishna River water to Chennai passes along the western boundary of Sri City.

Languages 
Telugu is the official and spoken language. Most of the educated populace speak English and are bi-lingual.

Demographics 
Sri City forms part of Satyavedu and Varadaiahpalem Mandals of Tirupati District. It is part of the Satyavedu constituency and Tirupati MP constituency. As per 2011 census the total population of the Satyavedu constituency is 2,77,010, with a literacy rate of 78.98, well over national rate of Literacy in India which stand at 74.04%.

Social organizations 
 Krea University
 Sankara Nethralaya (India)
 Institute of Financial Management and Research – IFMR (India)
 Indian Institute of Information Technology, Sri City
 Chinmaya Vidyalaya School (India)

Special Economic Zone

The integrated township includes various zones: Industrial, Residential, Educational, Commercial and Recreational.

The Industrial Zone includes a Special Economic Zone (SEZ) for Export Oriented Industry and Domestic Tariff Zone (DTZ) for Domestic Industry. It is a business destination for global companies to establish Manufacturing, Services and Trading operations in India.

The SEZ is administered by Andhra Pradesh Industrial Infrastructure Corporation (APIIC) & Industrial Area Local Authority (IALA). The Government appointed officer controls the planning and building approval processes. A Commissioner appointed by the Government of India, Ministry of Commerce, administers the (SEZ) area.

The SEZ was designed by Jurong Consultants, Singapore, taking into account future dimensions of expansion.

Transport 

Sricity is located in close proximity to Asian Highway 45. The Tirupati Airport is the nearest airport (82 km) Tada and Arambakkam railways stations are nearest railway stations to Sricity. Chennai Port and Ennore Ports are the nearest port to the town.

See also 
 Satish Dhawan Space Centre

External links 

 Sricity website
 Special Economic Zones in India
 City Website for more information about Civic Services & Administrative Offices, Accommodation, Recreation etc

References 

Towns in Tirupati district
Industrial parks in India
Special economic zones
Tax resistance
Special Economic Zones of India